Thubana eremophila is a moth in the family Lecithoceridae. It was described by Kyu-Tek Park in 2013. It is found in Cambodia.

The wingspan is 16–17 mm. The forewings are purplish dark brown, with two different lengths of yellowish-orange streaks basally. There is a well-developed large yellowish-orange costal patch and a yellowish-orange streak extended from the costal patch to the apex along the costa, as well as a round stigma on the outer margin of the patch medially. There are dark-brown scales along the margin of the termen. The hindwings are dark brown, with a bundle of orange-white hairs at the base.

Etymology
The species name is said to be derived from Greek eremos (meaning lonely, solitary) and philus (meaning love). In ancient Greek, the proper word for "love" (in the sense of affection or fondness) is philia (φιλία) or philos (φῖλος).

References

Moths described in 2013
Thubana
Moths of Asia